Dworki may refer to the following places in Poland:
Dworki, Lower Silesian Voivodeship (south-west Poland)
Dworki, Warmian-Masurian Voivodeship (north Poland)